= Mississippi Philosophical Association =

The Mississippi Philosophical Association is a philosophical organization whose purpose is to advance the study of philosophy in Mississippi. The organization sponsors an annual conference. The association sponsors a student essay contest, where first and second prize winners present papers at the annual conference. Addresses of the Mississippi Philosophical Association are published by Rodopi Publishers.
